Crateology was the 'science' of identifying the contents of Soviet shipments to the Island of Cuba carried out by the Central Intelligence Agency during the Cuban Missile Crisis.

Crateology has declined as a discipline in recent years due to globalisation and the decline in the usage of custom made wooden crates in favour of standard metal shipping containers. Though making the world intra-connected and smaller, globalisation has resulted in the loss of not merely a science, but a 'beautiful art form'.

See also 
 Aerial photographic and satellite image interpretation
 CIA activities in Cuba
 Cuban Missile Crisis
 National technical means of verification
 Remote sensing

References 

Cold War military history of the Soviet Union
Cuba–United States relations
History of Cuba
1962 in Cuba
History of the foreign relations of the United States
Presidency of John F. Kennedy
Nikita Khrushchev
Nuclear history of the United States
Nuclear warfare
Cuba–Soviet Union relations
Soviet Union–United States relations